Barbara Ann Fenton-Fung (born December 10, 1980) is an American politician serving as a member of the Rhode Island House of Representatives for the 15th district. Elected in November 2020, she assumed office on January 5, 2021.

Early life and education 
Fenton-Fung was born in Newport, Rhode Island, and was raised in Middletown. She graduated from Middletown High School in 1998 and Northeastern University, where she was valedictorian of the Bouvé College of Health Sciences. She later earned a Master of Science in physical therapy from Northeastern University. Fenton-Fung has also earned a master's degree in digital media management from Arkansas State University and obtained a certificate in emergency management from Auburn University.

Career 
After earning her master's degree in physical therapy, Fenton-Fung joined Rhode Island Hospital. She later became involved in Republican Party politics was president of the Rhode Island Young Republicans.

In the 2020 elections, Fenton-Fung ran for the District 15 seat in the Rhode Island House of Representatives against Nicholas Mattiello, the speaker of the state house. She defeated Mattiello by 18 points in the general election, and became the first Rhode Islander to defeat a sitting Speaker in 114 years. She is also the first woman to ever represent the district.

In the 2022 election, Fenton-Fung was challenged in the Republican primary.  She was victorious over Suzanne Downing, winning over 92% of the vote.  Fenton-Fung was unopposed in the general election.

Personal life 
Fenton-Fung met Allan Fung at the 2012 Republican National Convention. They married at St. Mary's Church in Newport, Rhode Island, in 2016.

References

External links

Living people
People from Newport, Rhode Island
Northeastern University alumni
Women state legislators in Rhode Island
Republican Party members of the Rhode Island House of Representatives
21st-century American women
People from Middletown, Connecticut
1980 births
Arkansas State University alumni